Nándor Fettich (7 January 1900, Acsád, Austria-Hungary – 17 May 1971, Budapest, Hungary) was a Hungarian archaeologist, goldsmith, and member of the Hungarian Academy of Sciences.

Biography
Fettich finished high school in Szombathely and Budapest. In, 1921, he graduated from the Eötvös Loránd University in Budapest in a doctorate in arts, with a thesis about votive tablets in the Roman province of Pannonia. From 1921 to 1923, he was a student of the flute department of the Franz Liszt Academy of Music. He, in 1926, worked in the Hungarian National Museum for Numismatic and antiquities collection of the charge of the Migration Period. Having learned Russian, he was posted as one of the only archaeologists of the Soviet Union from 1929 to 1935. He was the founding editor of Folia Archaeology in 1939. In 1941, he was appointed as the director of the Hungarian National Museum. In 1941, he became a goldsmith. He made many history-themed reliefs. After his retirement in 1945, he became a manual laborer, but he still worked as a goldsmith. In 1956, he was the author of several scientific papers. From 1957 to his death, he was a member of the Creative Union of Goldsmith Artists. In 1957, he participated in Expo 58 in Brussels. From 1959 to 1962, he was a member of the Hungarian Academy of Sciences as a contractual employee of Archaeological Research Group. He was awarded the Hungarian Archaeology and History of Art Medal of the Science Society and was a member of the Helsinki Finno-Ugric Company. Fettich attended several archaeological excavations.

Works
1926: The Avar age plastics industry in Hungary. Budapest.
1928: Green piles of steppe Scythian artifacts. Budapest.
1929: Bronzeguss und Nomadenkunst. Prague.
1934: garcsinovói Scythian artifacts. Budapest.
1935: The conquering Hungarians metalwork. Budapest.
1942: altungarische Die Kunst. Berlin.
1942: Der Fund von Čadjavica. Vjestnik hrvatskog Arheološkoga društvo NSXXII-XXIII / 1, 55–61.
1943: Győr story of XIII. century until the middle. Győr.
1943-47: Hungarian styles of Applied Arts I-III. Budapest.
Archaeological studies in the late 1951 Hun metalwork history. Budapest.
1953: Szeged-Nagyszeksos Hun prince grave finding. Budapest.
1958: Jánoshida Avar Age cemetery. Archaeological Papers II / 1.
1969: Recent data of prehistoric car in the Carpathian Basin. Studia Ethnographica 2. Budapest.
1990: Bánhalmi litter to find. The Szolnok County Museums Yearbook VII, 123–137.

Awards
1969: Finnish Lion Knights Knight's Cross

References
István Erdélyi: Fettich Nándor az ötvösművész, Műgyűjtő, 1973. 2. sz.
István Erdélyi: Fettich Nándor Ethnographia, 1971
Krisztina Kelbert: Fettich Nándor régész Vas megyei gyökerei, Savaria 29 (2006)
Gyula László: Nándor Fettich, Acta Archaeologica Academiae Scientiarum Hungaricae, 1972
Gyula László: Fettich Nándor emlékezete, Cumania 1, 1972
Mihály Párducz: Fettich Nándor, Archaeológiai Értesítő, 1972
Nándor Fettich ostromnaplója 1945. január 16. – február 9. Budapest 2000.
Vasi Szemle 2001 LV/4.

Sources
Magyar biographical lexicon IV: 1978-1991 (A to Z). Főszerk. Ágnes Kenyeres. Budapest: Academic. 1994.

External links
Mesterházy Károly: Fettich Nándor és a magyar honfoglalás régészete. Vasi Szemle 2001/ 4, 452-458.

1900 births
1971 deaths
Hungarian archaeologists
People from Vas County
Goldsmiths
Members of the Hungarian Academy of Sciences
20th-century archaeologists